Fraser McInnes (born 19 July 1993) is a former professional Australian rules footballer who played for the West Coast Eagles in the Australian Football League (AFL).

From Perth, McInnes attended Trinity College before being drafted by West Coast with the twenty-eighth pick in the 2011 national draft. He did not make his senior debut for the club until much later, instead continuing to play in the West Australian Football League (WAFL), initially for the Perth Football Club and then with West Coast's new affiliate team, . In the WAFL, he played in a variety of positions, with stints as a key forward, key backman, and ruckman.

McInnes made his AFL debut for West Coast in round four of the 2015 season, where he recorded fifteen possessions, eight marks, and a goal against . His most notable AFL game to date came against  in round seven of the 2015 season, when he recorded twenty-two disposals, seven marks, and a single goal.

After playing only two matches during the 2016 season, McInnes was delisted in October, however, he was re-drafted by West Coast in the 2017 rookie draft. He was made captain of the inaugural West Coast Eagles' reserves team in the 2019 WAFL season.

McInnes was once again delisted by West Coast at the conclusion of the 2019 season.

References

External links

WAFL Player Profile and Statistics

1993 births
Living people
West Coast Eagles players
East Perth Football Club players
People educated at Trinity College, Perth
Perth Football Club players
Australian rules footballers from Perth, Western Australia
West Coast Eagles (WAFL) players